The Pony Express is a 1925 American silent Western film produced by Famous Players-Lasky and distributed by Paramount Pictures. The film was directed by James Cruze and starred his wife, Betty Compson, along with Ricardo Cortez, Wallace Beery, and George Bancroft. Prints of this film survive, and it has been released on DVD.

Cast

References

External links

  
 
 Daybill or long lobby poster

1925 films
Films directed by James Cruze
Famous Players-Lasky films
Paramount Pictures films
1925 Western (genre) films
American black-and-white films
Silent American Western (genre) films
1920s American films
1920s English-language films